Sulino may refer to the following places:
Sulino, Choszczno County in West Pomeranian Voivodeship (north-west Poland)
Sulino, Pyrzyce County in West Pomeranian Voivodeship (north-west Poland)
Sulino, Stargard County in West Pomeranian Voivodeship (north-west Poland)